

The DFW C.III was a German reconnaissance aircraft produced during World War I.

Powered by a  Benz Bz.III, the DFW C.III was designed as a pusher biplane, and resembled the pusher aircraft built by Breguet. However, the C.III remained a prototype only.

References

Bibliography

1910s German military reconnaissance aircraft
C.III
Single-engined tractor aircraft
Biplanes